Islam in Yemen dates back to about 630AD, when it  was introduced into the region by Khalid ibn al-Walid and then Ali who finalized the conquest of it when Muhammad was still alive. It was during this period that the mosques in Janad (near Ta'izz) and the Great Mosque of Sana'a were built. Yemenis are divided into two principal Islamic religious groups: 65% Sunni and 35% Shia. Others put the numbers of Shias at 30%. The denominations are as follows: 65% primarily of the Shafi'i and other orders of Sunni Islam. 33% of the Zaidi order of Shia Islam, 2% of the Ja'fari and Tayyibi Ismaili orders of Shia Islam. Yemen is home to the Sulaymani Bohra community, a subdivision of Tayyibi Mustali Ismailism. The Sunnis are predominantly in the south and southeast. The Zaidis are predominantly in the north and northwest whilst the Jafaris are in the main centres of the North such as Sana'a and Ma'rib. There are mixed communities in the larger cities. 

According to WIN/Gallup International polls, Yemen has the most religious population among Arab countries and it is one of the most religious population world-wide.

Population
The Zaidis of the northern highlands dominated politics and cultural life in northern Yemen for centuries; with Unification of Yemen, and the addition of the south’s almost totally Sunni Muslim population, the numerical balance has shifted dramatically away from the Zaidis. Nevertheless, Zaidis are still over represented in the government and, in particular, in the former North Yemeni units within the armed forces. 

Houthi authorities in Sana’a formally enacted new regulations on the collection and use of zakat, the Islamic obligation for individuals to donate a portion of their wealth each year to charitable causes. The executive bylaw, signed by Mehdi al-Mashat, president of the Houthi-run Supreme Political Council (SPC), imposes a khums tax (literally meaning “one-fifth”, or 20 percent) on economic activities involving natural resources in areas under the group’s control in Yemen, which includes most of northern Yemen where some 70 percent of the population lives.

Society
Public schools provide instruction in Islam but not in other religions, although Muslim citizens are allowed to attend private schools that do not teach Islam. In an effort to curb ideological and religious extremism in schools, the government does not permit any courses outside the officially approved curriculum to be taught in private and national schools. Because the government is concerned that unlicensed religious schools deviate from formal educational rirements and promote militant ideology, it has closed more than 4,500 of these institutions and deported foreign students studying there.

See also

 Freedom of religion in Yemen
 Islam by country
 Islamic history of Yemen
 Religion in Yemen
 Shia Islam in Yemen

References

External links